Spilotes pullatus, commonly known as the caninana, tiger rat snake, chicken snake, yellow rat snake, serpiente tigre or tigre is a species of large nonvenomous colubrid snake endemic to warmer parts of the Americas.

Geographic range
It is found in southern Mexico, Central America, northern and central South America, and Trinidad and Tobago.

Description

Dorsally, S. pullatus is black with yellow spots which may form crossbands. The tip of the snout is yellow. The head shields may be mostly yellow, or mostly black, or crossbanded with a combination of yellow and black, but the sutures between the shields are always black. Ventrally, it is yellow with irregular black crossbands.

The body is relatively slender and somewhat laterally compressed. The head is distinct from the neck. The eye is moderate in size with a round pupil. There are no suboculars, and the loreal is either very small or absent. There are 6 or 7 upper labials, the 3rd and 4th entering the eye, the last two very large. The dorsal scales are pointed and overlapping.

The dorsal scales are arranged in 16 (or 14) rows at midbody. Ventrals 198-232; anal plate entire; subcaudals 90-120, divided.

Habitat
It tends to inhabit forested areas, and is often found near water.

Behavior
It is mainly arboreal, but also terrestrial. It is diurnal and an active forager.

Diet
It feeds on a wide variety of prey, including small mammals (such as rodents and bats), birds, lizards, other reptiles, amphibians, and eggs.

Subspecies 

Including the nominotypical subspecies, the following five subspecies are recognized:
 Spilotes pullatus anomalepis Bocourt, 1888
 Spilotes pullatus argusiformis Amaral, 1929
 Spilotes pullatus maculatus Amaral, 1929
 Spilotes pullatus mexicanus (Laurenti, 1768)
 Spilotes pullatus pullatus (Linnaeus, 1758)

References

Further reading
 
Freiberg, M. 1982. Snakes of South America. T.F.H. Publications. Hong Kong. 189 pp. . (Spilotes pullatus, pp. 110, 140 + photograph on p. 154.)
Linnaeus, C. 1758. Systema naturæ per regna tria naturæ, secundum classes, ordines, genera, species, cum characteribus, differentiis, synonymis, locis. Tomus I. Editio Decima, Reformata. L. Salvius. Stockholm. 824 pp. (Coluber pullatus, p. 225.)

External links

Colubrids
Snakes of Central America
Reptiles of Trinidad and Tobago
Reptiles of Guyana
Reptiles of Panama
Reptiles described in 1758
Taxa named by Carl Linnaeus